The human history of Western Australia commenced between 40,000 and 60,000 years ago with the arrival of Aboriginal Australians on the northwest coast. The first inhabitants expanded across the east and south of the continent.

The first recorded European contact was in 1616, when Dutch explorer Dirk Hartog landed on the west coast, having been blown off course while en route to Batavia, nowadays called Jakarta.

Although many expeditions visited the coast during the next 200 years, there was no lasting attempt at establishment of a permanent settlement until December 1826 when an expedition on behalf of the New South Wales colonial government, led by Major Edmund Lockyer, landed at King George Sound, and became the port city of Albany. On 21 January 1827 Lockyer formally took possession for the British Crown of the portion of New Holland not yet claimed by the British Crown; that is, the portion west of 129th meridian east. This was followed by the establishment of the Swan River Colony in 1829, which ultimately became the present-day capital, Perth. The harsh conditions faced by the settlers resulted in population growth being minimal until the discovery of gold in the 1880s.  Since the gold rush, the population of the state has risen steadily, with substantial growth in the period since World War II.

Western Australia gained the right of self-government in 1890, and joined with the five other states to form the Commonwealth of Australia in 1901. The desire of Western Australians to revert to complete self-governance, separate from the Commonwealth, culminated in 1933 with a successful referendum for secession supported by 68% of electors. In 1935 the British parliament declined to act since secession would require the assent of the Australian parliament, and the movement lapsed with an improving economy and generous federal grants.

Aboriginal settlement

When Australia's first inhabitants arrived on the northwest coast 40,000 to 60,000 years ago the sea levels were much lower. Therefore, this was a possible (even probable) location for which Australia's first immigrants could arrive via some primitive boat. Other possible immigration routes were via islands further north and then through New Guinea.

In 1999 Charles Dortch identified chert and calcrete flake stone tools, found at Rottnest Island, as possibly dating to at least 50,000 years ago. A 2018 study using archaeobotany dated evidence of continuous human habitation at Karnatukul (Serpent's Glen) in the Carnarvon Range in the Little Sandy Desert from around 50,000 years ago.
 
Over the next tens of thousands of years various groups of Indigenous Australians slowly moved southward and eastward across the landmass. Aboriginal people were well established throughout Western Australia by the time European ships started accidentally arriving en route to Batavia (now Jakarta) in the early 17th century.

Early visits by Europeans

The first European to sight Western Australia was the Dutch explorer, Dirk Hartog, the first European to suggest to have found a continent there, who on 26 October 1616 landed at what is now known as Cape Inscription, Dirk Hartog Island. Before departing, Hartog left behind an inscribed pewter plate affixed to a post.  In 1696 the plate was discovered and replaced by Willem de Vlamingh and repatriated to the Rijksmuseum in Amsterdam. A multitude of Dutch visits followed during that century, charting virtually the whole of the west coast, the Western Australian south coast and Australia's northern coast.

The first English vessel to visit, when attempting to sail the Dutch-established Brouwer Route to the Indies, was Tryall, an East India Company-owned East Indiaman under the command of John Brookes who in 1622 sighted Point Cloates before later on 25 May wrecking on Tryal Rocks, off the northwest coast of Australia. Some of the 143 crew remained on the Monte Bello Islands for 7 days, during that time sighting Barrow Island, before sailing to Batavia in a longboat. A second boat brought some more crew to Batavia, so just over 40 people survived, including Brookes. Almost one hundred crew apparently perished in the wreck. Tryall became Australia's oldest known shipwreck.

A later English visitor was William Dampier, who in 1699 sailed down some of the western coast of Australia.  He noted the lack of water and in his description of Shark Bay in his account "A Voyage to New Holland", he expressed his frustration:

A number of sections of the Western Australian coastline were given names which did not last past the exploratory era in names of features – such as Eendrachtsland. However some names, such as 't Landt van de Leeuwin (Leeuwin's Land), materialised at a later date as Cape Leeuwin.

Timeline of European discovery and exploration

Below is a timeline of significant events from the 1616 landfall of Dirk Hartog until the eventual settlement of the Swan River Colony in 1829:
1616 – Dirk Hartog in Eendracht arrived at Cape Inscription and left a pewter plate. Coastal region in the vicinity is shown on Hartog's maps as Eendrachtsland. Believed to be first landfall on Western Australian soil by Europeans. (An earlier 1606 encounter on the northern coast of Australia near Papua New Guinea by Willem Janszoon on Duyfken is credited as being the first Australian visit by European explorers.)
1618 – Dutch East India Company supercargo Willem Janszoon on Mauritius landed on North West Cape – although sighting footprints, they did not meet the natives.
1618 – Zeewulf made landfall north of Eendrachtsland.
1619 – Frederick de Houtman in two ships bound for Batavia encountered dangerous shoals which were subsequently named Houtman Abrolhos.  Following successful navigation of the Abrolhos, Houtman made landfall in the region Hartog had encountered.
1622 – Leeuwin landed south of Abrolhos.
1622 – English ship Tryall was wrecked on Tryal Rocks off the northwest coast; survivors spent a week on Monte Bello Islands before sailing to Batavia in a longboat.
1626 to 1627 – Gulden Zeepaert skippered by François Thijssen sailed along south coast towards Great Australian Bight.
1629 – Batavia struck a reef of the Abrolhos.  Skipper Francisco Pelsaert sailed the ship's small boat to Batavia for rescue.  After returning 3 months later, he found evidence of mutiny and many previous survivors murdered.
1658 – Three Dutch ships visited south coast searching for Vergulde Draeck: Waekende Boey under Captain S. Volckertszoon, Elburg under Captain J. Peereboom and Emeloort under Captain A. Joncke.
1681 – English navigator John Daniel on New London charted part of the west coast of Australia, including Rottnest Island and the Wallabi Group of Houtman Abrolhos.
1688 and 1699 – William Dampier in Cygnet explored the northwest coastline and sailed down the coast.
1697 – Willem de Vlamingh found Hartog's plate and replaced it with his own. He also explored the Swan River area.
1712 – Zuytdorp with 286 on board was shipwrecked near Kalbarri. The Dutch did not send a search party, probably because no survivors were able to report the disaster. The crew were never heard from again, though it is probable that many initially survived because a campsite was found near the wreck.
1714 – Jean-Pierre Pury proposed a Dutch East India Company settlement of Nuyts, Leeuwin and Edels Lands.
1772 – On 30 March, Frenchman Louis Aleno de St Aloüarn landed at Turtle Bay at the northern end of Dirk Hartog Island and claimed the island for France.
1786 – King Gustav III of Sweden makes a contract with William Bolts to establish a colony at the Swan River.
1791 – George Vancouver made formal claim at Possession Point, King George Sound, Albany.
1792 – Frenchman Bruni d'Entrecasteaux in charge of Recherche and Esperance reached Cape Leeuwin on 5 December and explored eastward along the southern coast.
1801 – The French ships Géographe and Naturaliste under Nicolas Baudin and Emmanuel Hamelin, explored much of the coast north from Cape Leeuwin, including the Swan River. They discovered de Vlamingh's plate.
1801 – Matthew Flinders on HMS Investigator sighted Cape Leeuwin en route to charting of southern Australian coastline.
1803 – Matthew Flinders completed the first circumnavigation of Australia
1803 – Géographe and another French ship  followed much of the same coastline again on the way back to France.
1818 – Louis de Freycinet found de Vlamingh's plate and removed it to France.
1826 – On 26 October, Frenchman Dumont d'Urville in another ship named Astrolabe visited King George Sound before sailing along the south coast to Port Jackson.
1826 – On 26 December, a military garrison was established on behalf of New South Wales at King George Sound with the arrival of Major Edmund Lockyer on Amity. 
1827 – On 21 January, Lockyer formally annexed the western portion of Australia, now Western Australia, in a ceremony at King George Sound. 
1829 – James Stirling explored the Swan River area. Captain Charles Fremantle again took possession of the western side of New Holland for the British crown on 2 May.

Colonial era

King George Sound

The first formal claim of possession for Great Britain was made on 29 September 1791 by Commander (later Captain) George Vancouver RN, on a spot he named Possession Point, at the tip of the peninsula between the waters he also named Princess Royal Harbour and King George the Third's Sound at Albany ("the Third" was dropped from the name in 1826).

In the early 19th century the British became concerned about the possibility of a French colony being established on the west coast of Australia. In 1826 the Governor of New South Wales, Ralph Darling, ordered the establishment of a settlement at King George's Sound. An army detachment was sent from Sydney headed by Major Edmund Lockyer with eighteen soldiers, one captain, one doctor, one storekeeper and twenty-three convicts.

On 21 January 1827 the whole of Australia was finally claimed as British territory when Major Lockyer formally annexed the western portion of the continent in a ceremony on King George Sound.

In March 1831 the penal settlement was withdrawn, and the control of King George's Sound was transferred from New South Wales to the Swan River Colony. Captain James Stirling decreed that the settlement would be named "Albany" from 1 January 1832.

The Swan River Colony

The first significant European settlements were established on the Swan River by James Stirling in 1829. The colonists first sighted land on 1 June, an official Proclamation was made on 18 June and the foundation of the colony took place on 12 August. As Lieutenant Governor, Stirling had sole authority to draft laws and decide day-to-day affairs. On 6 February 1832, the colony was renamed Western Australia.

Major towns of the colony developed slowly into the port city of Fremantle, the main settlement of Perth  up river, and Guildford.

Expansion 1829–1850

Much of the land around the Swan River Colony was unsuitable for agriculture and it was inevitable that the colony would have to expand beyond the Swan River area after the most fertile locations were quickly settled.

Sheep farming was the most successful early agricultural activity, and the basis of all expansion until the 1850s.

1829: A military outpost was founded at Bunbury.
1830: Area around Augusta settled.
1830: The first exploration over the Darling Range to search for suitable farming land occurred with the settlement of the Avon Valley and the foundation of the town of York in 1831. 
1832
 The main settlement is officially named Perth, after Sir George Murray's seat in Perthshire, Scotland.
 First sitting of the Western Australian Legislative Council, consisting of four officials appointed by Stirling to assist him in decision-making.
1833: On 5 January, the first newspaper, the Perth Gazette was launched.
1833: Relations between the Europeans and Aboriginal people were not always amicable with many intercultural skirmishes. Yagan, a senior warrior of the local Aboriginal tribe near the Swan River was killed on 11 July of this year after a bounty was issued for his capture following the murder of a couple of settlers.
1834: Battle of Pinjarra (aka Pinjarra Massacre): This was the worst intercultural battle, happening on 28 October. Depending on the source, the death toll ranged from 10 to 150.
1836: settlement in the Toodyay region. 
1837–39: George Grey explored the coasts of:
 the North West (1837)
 Gascoyne and Murchison (1839)
 1839: another four members, drawn from the ranks of private settlers, were added to the official members of the Legislative Council.
1841: Explorer Edward John Eyre arrives in Albany walking across the Nullarbor Plain from the eastern states. In Wonnerup near Busselton, settler George Layman Sr of Wonnerup House was speared to death by a Wardandi elder.
1843: Census recorded the population of Western Australia as 3,842.
1844: A 15-year-old John Gavin was the first European legally hanged in the colony, for the murder of 18-year-old George Pollard.
1848–1850: After 19 years of settlement, growth was very slow. The population of the area around Perth was still only about 1,400. In 1850 the population of the state as a whole had only increased to 5,886. This population had settled mainly around the southwestern coastline at Bunbury, Augusta and Albany. 
1849: First discovery of gold occurred in the Jimperding-Toodyay area.

Convict era 

While Western Australia was initially a "free settlement", economic problems for settler capitalists led them to seek the transportation of British convicts. WA became a penal colony in 1850.

The Gregory brothers led major exploration expeditions to many parts of the colony, including:
1851: Augustus Gregory surveys the Greenough region near Geraldton and that area opens up to farming.
1861: Francis Gregory explores the interior of the Nickol Bay region (known later as the Pilbara).

By 1859, all the other Australian colonies had their own parliaments and colonists in Western Australia began pushing for the right to govern themselves. The British Colonial Office opposed this because of the slow rate of growth and the presence of convicts. Petitions asking for some of the positions in the Legislative Council to be filled by elected members were presented to London twice during the 1860s.

By 1868, over 9,000 convicts had been transported to Western Australia on 43 convict ship voyages.

Expansion 1861–1885
Wool production, usually on large stations, was also the basis of expansion further east and northward.

The first permanent settlements in the North West (later divided into the Pilbara and Kimberley regions) took place in the mid-1860s, initially at the Harding River, De Grey River and Roebourne (gazetted in 1867). Pearling also came to dominate the North West, initially in Nickol Bay, with a fleet at Tien Tsin Harbor (later renamed Cossack). In the North West, unlike southern WA, the labour force was dominated by Indigenous Australians, often under harsh forms of unfree labour.

In 1870, some members of the Legislative Council were elected for the first time, although only male settlers with significant property could vote and the Governor could still veto the council's decisions.

John Forrest led two major expeditions:
1870 – retracing Edward John Eyre's land route from Perth to Adelaide, as the route of a telegraph line;
1874 – leading a party to the watershed of the Murchison River and then eastward into the Central Desert.

In 1872, controversial explorer Peter Egerton Warburton made a journey from Alice Springs to the Western Australian coast.

Ernest Giles twice traversed the Gibson Desert between 1872 and 1876.

During the 1870s, the Murchison and Gascoyne regions were also settled by Europeans.

Other notable events
1877: The telegraph from Adelaide to Perth was completed, considerably improving intracontinental communication
1883: Durack family settle around the Ord River in the East Kimberley.

Gold discoveries, 1885–1900 

Until the 1880s the economy of the state was based largely on wool and wheat. A major change in the colony's fortunes occurred in 1885 when gold was discovered and prospectors by the tens of thousands swarmed across the land in a desperate attempt to discover new goldfields.

In 1887 a new constitution, including proposals for responsible government, was drafted and sent to London by Governor Broome for approval. It was argued that due to the increasing wealth being generated by gold rushes, Western Australia should become a self-governing colony.  An Act granting self-government was passed by the British Parliament in 1890, giving the Colony independence from the UK in matters other than foreign policy, defence and "native affairs".  Section 70 of the self-government act established an Aboriginal Protection Board, under the control of the British Parliament, not the Western Australian one.  Governor Broome had earlier warned the British Colonial Office that the Western Australians were not to be trusted in matters relating to Aboriginal persons.  A further clause to the constitution stated that 5,000 pounds or one percent of state revenues, whichever was the greater, was to be allocated to Aboriginal persons for their welfare and advancement.  Many settlers resented these clauses, and Western Australia has never honoured this clause to its own constitution.  A previous Governor, Sir William Robinson, was re-appointed to supervise the change.  He travelled by train from Albany to Perth and towns en route lit bonfires and people gathered at railway sidings to celebrate his arrival and the new constitution.  His arrival in Perth on 21 October 1890 saw the city decorated with elaborate floral arches spanning the city's main streets and buildings were decked with banners and flags.

In 1891 the rush to the Murchison goldfields began when Tom Cue discovered gold at the town which now bears his name. In the years that followed dozens of gold towns – Day Dawn, Nannine, Peak Hill, Garden Gully, Dead Finish, Pinnicles, Austin Island and Austin Mainland – flourished only to be abandoned when the seams were exhausted and the gold fever moved on.

The influx of miners from the eastern colonies and from overseas increased the presence of trade unions in Western Australia. The Trades and Labor Council, Perth was established in 1891 and Perth Trades Hall opened (1912). The first edition of the Westralian Worker appeared on 7 September 1900 and was followed shortly afterwards by the opening of the Kalgoorlie Trades Hall, the first such hall in Western Australia. A Trades Hall was opened in Fremantle in 1904.

An influx of people from Victoria, South Australia, and Tasmania led to Australian rules football becoming the dominant football code when several local rugby football clubs switched codes.

Sir John Forrest – the first Premier of Western Australia and its only premier as a Colony – clashed with Robinson over Section 70. While Forrest had argued that Western Australians should accept Section 70 to obtain self-government, by 1892 he was attempting to have it changed. William Traylen MP argued that "as our revenue is growing up now, and the natives can scarcely be said to be increasing in numbers, we shall be paying a very undue proportion of our income as a colony for the purpose of supporting the Aboriginal native race".

Discoveries at Coolgardie (1892) and Paddy Hannan's discovery at Kalgoorlie (1893) sparked true gold fever. Coolgardie prospered particularly well, becoming the third largest town in the colony after Perth and Fremantle.

Gold inspired a new wave of exploration, including David Carnegie who, in 1896, led an epic expedition that traveled through the deserts north of Coolgardie, through the Gibson and Great Sandy Deserts to Halls Creek in the Kimberley, before returning to Coolgardie.

In the late 19th century there was talk of the gold-rich region around Kalgoorlie seceding from Western Australia, as a colony/state called "Auralia". This campaign coincided with the reluctance in Perth regarding Western Australia taking part in Australian Federation.  Talk of miners' separation and them taking their wealth elsewhere was seen as a threat to the stability of the colony.

In 1899, Forrest succeeded unilaterally passed the Constitution Amendment Act, taking control of Aboriginal Affairs without approval of the British House of Commons. Many Aboriginal people argue that the 1899 amendment was an illegal usurpation of British government power and one percent of accumulated Government revenues should be set aside for Aboriginal welfare, as intended.

 Other notable events
1887: On 22 April, a cyclone struck the pearling fleet at Eighty Mile Beach near Broome claiming 140 lives. The storm was unexpected, being so late in the season.
1889: The Great Southern Railway was opened with subsequent economic growth to the regions along the line. The wheat industry did not really get going until the construction of railways. A railway line had reached Coolgardie (from Perth) by 1896.
1895: Kings Park was officially opened on 10 August.
1897: As part of the Western Australian Government's attempt to gain control of Aboriginal Affairs, the Aborigines Act 1897 abolished the Aborigines Protection Board and established the Aborigines Department.
1897: Fremantle Inner Harbour was officially opened after dredging and construction under the supervision of C. Y. O'Connor.

Federation of Australia

On 1 January 1901, following a proclamation by Queen Victoria, Western Australia, along with the other five British colonies of New South Wales, Queensland, South Australia, Tasmania and Victoria, formed the federation of the Commonwealth of Australia, of which they each became component states. However, Western Australia was rather reluctant to join the union, doing so only after they were offered a five-year transitional period on inter-state tariffs and a transcontinental railway line.

Development during the early twentieth century

The wealth generated from gold soon disappeared and by the early years of the 20th century, the economy was once again dependent on wool and wheat. This dependency meant that a dramatic fall in wool and wheat prices in the late 1920s – early 1930s saw the state's economic collapse. It was not to recover until after World War II when the Federal Government's postwar immigration policy saw a huge influx of migrants, nearly all of them from Europe, in the period 1947 to 1970.

Important events in Western Australia included the following:
1902: The Premier, George Leake, died suddenly on 24 June aged 45. Frederick Illingworth became the caretaker Premier for a week before Walter James formed a new ministry on 1 July. George Leake is the only Western Australian Premier to die in office.
1903: A pipeline from Mundaring Weir to Kalgoorlie is opened. This was a major achievement for its time by the state's first engineer-in-chief C. Y. O'Connor, who committed suicide before the project was complete.
1904: John Drayton is imprisoned under parliamentary privilege provisions in Western Australia for refusing to pay a fine. This is the first and, until 1955, only, time that an Australian parliament punished somebody under parliamentary privilege provisions.
1911: The University of Western Australia becomes Western Australia's first university. No teaching happens until 1913 though. It wasn't until 1975 that Western Australia's second university, Murdoch University opened.
1912: A cyclone crossed the coast just west of Balla Balla near Port Hedland and claimed well over 150 lives. This was almost certainly Australia's worst weather-related maritime disaster of the 20th century with the loss of the coastal steamer Koombana.
1916: First of two referendums on overseas conscription in World War I. Western Australia is an outlier in the vote, with 69.7% of voters voting in favour, in contrast to only 48.4% nationwide.
1917: Second referendum on overseas conscription in World War I. 64.4% of Western Australian voters vote in favour, while only 46.2% of Australian voters overall do so.
1917: The transcontinental railway is complete, fulfilling a promise by the Federal Government when the Colony of Western Australia voted to become a state of Australia at Federation in 1901. Construction of this last leg between Kalgoorlie and Port Augusta had begun in 1912.
1920: Edward, the Prince of Wales (the future King Edward VIII) was involved in a train derailment, in which his carriage overturned in the state's south west. The train was moving at a low speed and he did not sustain any injuries.
1920: Western Australia passed legislation allowing women to stand for parliament, Edith Cowan was elected to the Legislative Assembly becoming the first woman elected to any Australian parliament.
1929: Western Australia Centenary.
1930: Perth is connected to Adelaide (and subsequently the rest of the eastern states) by a telephone line.

In a referendum in 1933, 68% of voters favoured secession. The Premier, Philip Collier, argued in London for secession but the British decided they could not grant it.
1935: The Lacepede Islands near Broome were struck by a cyclone, which sank 21 pearling luggers with 141 lives lost. This was Australia's second deadliest cyclone in the 20th century.

World War II

1941: Battle between HMAS Sydney and the German raiding ship Kormoran off the coast near Carnarvon. Both ships sank, and the entire crew of 645 onboard Sydney was lost.
1942: Japanese planes attack Broome. The official death toll was 88. The settlements of Wyndham, Derby, Port Hedland and the Drysdale River Mission (Kalumburu) also experienced casualties.
1942–1945: Japanese occupation of Christmas Island, now one of two Australian Indian Ocean Territories.

Postwar era (1946–1970s)
1946: Over 800 Aboriginal workers took part in the 1946 Pilbara strike, the first such kind of action taken by Indigenous Australians.
1947: Western Australia enters the country's domestic cricket competition, the Sheffield Shield. Though Western Australia only entered on a probationary basis, it managed to win the shield in its first season.
1949: Douglas DC-3 Fitzroy crashed after take-off from Guildford aerodrome, killing all 18 people on board.
1950: The worst civil aircraft accident in Australian history occurred when all 29 people on board the Douglas DC-4 Amana died after it crashed near York on a flight from Perth to Adelaide.
1952: On 3 October the first nuclear bomb was exploded on Australian soil at the Montebello Islands. It was part of Operation Hurricane, Britain's first-ever nuclear weapon test. 
February–March 1961: In arguably Western Australia's worst bushfires, many small communities were destroyed including 132 houses in Dwellingup. There were no fatalities, but 800 people were left homeless.
1961: Minerals boom begins with the removal of iron ore export ban. The economy is bolstered over the next two decades by nickel mines around Kalgoorlie and iron ore mines in the north-west.
1964: Serial killer Eric Edgar Cooke was the last person hanged in Western Australia.
1964: On 31 December, Donald Campbell broke the world water speed record in the Bluebird K7 on Lake Dumbleyung. He reached . Campbell died in the same vehicle in 1967 in a later record attempt in England.
1967: Aboriginal people were recognized as Australian citizens with the right to vote
1968: On 14 October, the Meckering earthquake occurred with a moment magnitude of 6.5 and a maximum Mercalli intensity of IX (Violent).
1968: On 31 December, all 26 people on board MacRobertson Miller Airlines Flight 1750 from Perth to Port Hedland died when the aircraft, a Vickers Viscount, crashed near Port Hedland.
1970: The Indian Pacific train completed its first journey by rail across the continent from Sydney to Perth. Though the transcontinental railway had been complete since 1917, this is the first time one train could make the journey uninterrupted by gauge changes.

Events since 1971 

1972: Minimum voting age lowered to 18.
1974: Change of government. Charles Courts Liberal-Country Party coalition defeats the Labor government.
1979: The NASA space station Skylab crashed in the remote south eastern part of the state. Places like Rawlinna and Balladonia received international attention.
1979: On 2 June 1979 there was a significant earthquake just east of Cadoux that was felt in Perth.
1979: WAY 1979 and the publishing of the Sesquicentenary Celebrations Series (Western Australia) by the celebrations committee and Government.
1980: Government closes the Fremantle railway line and replaces the services with buses. The closure galvanises public opposition and becomes a major campaign issue in the 1983 election resulting in a change of government under Brian Burke.
1981: Discovery of the Gorgon gas deposit.
1983: Beginnings of WA Inc. Government deals with private businessmen lead to the loss of $600 million in public money.
19 November 1990: Labor Premier Carmen Lawrence initiates a Royal Commission into state government dealings with private businesses. The findings of the commission led to the conviction and imprisonment of two previous Premiers—Brian Burke and Ray O'Connor.
1993: The Perth-Joondalup railway line completed to extend rail transport to Perth's northern suburbs.
1993: Change of government. Labor loses to the Richard Court Liberal-National coalition Government.
1996: The Liberal-National coalition loses control of the Upper House with the balance of power shifting to minority parties.
1997: Western Australian parliament issues a formal apology to the stolen generation.
2001: Change of government with Geoff Gallop's Labor government defeating the coalition on the back of an anti-old growth logging platform.
December 2007: The Perth-Mandurah railway line opens.
2008: Change of government with the election of the Barnett Government.
2008: The historic ban on uranium mining reversed.
2016: Elizabeth Quay, a mixed-use development project in the Perth central business district opens.
2017: Change of government with Mark McGowan leading Labor to a landslide victory over the coalition.
2020: Western Australia closes its borders to all states of Australia to stop the spread of COVID-19.
2020: Clive Palmer sues Western Australia repeatedly for the closed borders.
2021: Mark McGowan wins state election with another landslide, said to be caused by his strong border policy.

See also
Historical Records of Australia
History of Australia

Notes

References

Further reading
 Battye, James Sykes. Western Australia: A History from its Discovery to the Inauguration of the Commonwealth (Clarendon Press, 1924) online.
 Beattie, James. "Imperial landscapes of health: Place, plants and people between India and Australia, 1800s–1900s." Health and History 14.1 (2012): 100-120 online.
 Bolton, Geoffrey. Land of Vision and Mirage: Western Australian since 1826. (U of Western Australia Press, 2008)..
 Briscoe, Gordon. Counting, health and identity: A history of Aboriginal health and demography in Western Australia and Queensland, 1900-1940 (Aboriginal Studies Press, 2003).
 Charnley, W. "The Swan River Venture" History Today (Mar 1960), Vol. 10 Issue 3, p158-16, covers 1827 to 1839
 Crowley, F. K. Australia's Western Third: A History of Western Australia from the First Settlements to Modern Times. (Macmillan, 1960).
 Davis, Russell Earls. A concise history of Western Australia (Woodslane Press, 2019).
 
 Forrest, Kay. The challenge and the chance: The colonisation and settlement of North West Australia 1861-1914 (Hesperian Press, 1996).
 Glynn, Sean. Government Policy and Agricultural Development: A Study of the Role of Government in the Development of the Western Australian wheat belt, 1900-1930 (U of Western Australia Press, 1975).
 Gooding, Janda. Western Australian art and artists, 1900-1950 (Western Australia State Government, 1987).
 Hasluck, Alexandra. Unwilling emigrants: A study of the convict period in Western Australia (Oxford UP, 1959).
 
 Nayton, Gaye. The archaeology of market capitalism: A western Australian perspective (Springer Science & Business Media, 2011).
 Rankin, D. H. The History of the Development of Education in Western Australia (1926) online
 Stannage, C. T. (ed)  A New History of Western Australia. (U of Western Australia Press, 1981).
 Taylor, Affrica. "'The sun always shines in Perth': a post‐colonial geography of identity, memory and place." Australian Geographical Studies 38.1 (2000): 27–35.
 Tonts, Matthew. "State policy and the Yeoman ideal: Agricultural development in Western Australia, 1890-1914." Landscape Research 27.1 (2002): 103-115 online.

External links
Constitutional Centre of W.A.
Centre for WA History